Hendrik Andreas Jacobus Veerman (born 26 February 1991) is a Dutch professional footballer who plays as a forward for FC Volendam.

Career
In August 2018, Veerman joined 2. Bundesliga side FC St. Pauli from SC Heerenveen signing a three-year contract until 2021.

On 26 January 2022, Veerman signed a 2.5-year contract with FC Utrecht.

On 31 July 2022, Veerman returned to his first professional club FC Volendam on a three-year contract.

Personal life
Veerman has two children. In 2021, Veerman named his second child after SC Heerenveen teammate Joey Veerman.

Career statistics

References

External links
 
 Voetbal International profile 

1991 births
Living people
People from Volendam
Association football forwards
Dutch footballers
FC Volendam players
SC Heerenveen players
FC St. Pauli players
FC Utrecht players
Eredivisie players
Eerste Divisie players
2. Bundesliga players
Dutch expatriate footballers
Dutch expatriate sportspeople in Germany
Expatriate footballers in Germany
Footballers from North Holland